Man in the Kitchen is a 2017 South Korean television series starring Choi Soo-young, On Joo-wan, Seo Hyo-rim, and Park Jin-woo. The series aired on MBC every Saturday and Sunday from 8:45 p.m. to 10:00 p.m. (KST). It was then later changed to air 2 episodes every Sunday from 8:45 p.m. to 11:00 p.m. (KST) from November 12 onwards.

Synopsis
Lee Roo-ri (Choi Soo-young) tries to get a job at big company, but she gives up. She doesn't have a good relationship with her strict father. Lee Roo-ri decides to travel to Guam to get away. There, she meets Jung Tae-yang (On Joo-wan) who goes by the YOLO motto. He wanders around the world and places priority on his happiness, but he also carries an emotional wound.

After she meets Jung Tae-yang, Lee Roo-ri experiences a turning point in her life.

Cast

Main
 Choi Soo-young as Lee Roo-ri- the jobless daughter of Lee Shin-mo and Hong Young-hye. she went through a rough childhood because of Shin-mo, and later accepts a job offer to a food company
 Choi Yoo-ri as young Lee Roo-ri
 On Joo-wan as Jung Tae-yang- the biological son of Kevin Miller, he's a smart but easily annoyed man. throughout the series, he finds more and more about his backstory
 Seo Hyo-rim as Ha Yeon-joo- the spoiled daughter of Yoon-Choon ok, who later gets into an on off relationship with Lee So-won
 Park Jin-woo as Lee So-won- Roo-ri's brother and Lee Shin-mo and Hong Young-hye's son. He was pampered by Shin-mo as a kid, and works as a doctor. He later gets into an on off relationship with Ha Yeon-joo

Supporting

Roo-ri's household
 Kim Kap-soo as Lee Shin-mo- the rich father of Roo-ri and So-won. he's a gruff, self centered, abusive man who pampers So-won and disregards Roo-ri as a waste. however, later throughout the series, he grows to become kinder and kinder, revealing that he had always cared for Roo-ri
 Kim Mi-sook as Hong Young-hye- the abused and worked out wife of Shin-mo. Shes constantly burned out due to Shin-mo, and later moves out and works at a mattress store
 Kim Soo-mi as Yang Choon-ok- the rich mother of Ha Yeon-joo. she constantly feels guilt of leaving her little brother at a train station while trying to escape their abusive mother

Tae-yang's household
 Lee Il-hwa as Jung Hwa-young- Taeyang's biological mother 
 Shim Hyung-tak as Go Jung-do- Taeyang's step-father who works at a bakery
 Song Kang as Kim Woo-joo- Taeyang's step brother. he's constantly caring for Eun-byul 
 Kim Ji-young as Go Eun-byul- Taeyang's step sister and Woo-joo's sister.
 Lee Jae-ryong as Kevin Miller- Taeyang's biological father and Choon-ok's brother. he went to the US after being left behind by Choon-ok at a train station, but later becomes the head of a foods company.

Extended

 Lee Kyu-jung as Jung Soo-mi
 Han Ki-woong as Hee-cheol	
 Kim Hye-yoon as Jung Soo-ji 
 Choi Su-rin as Susanna / Lee Kyeong-hwa	
 Jo Mi-ryung as Choi Teresa
 Lee Jung-hyuk as Manager Kim
 Kim Ji-sook as Choi Sun-young
 Tae Hang-ho as Noh Ji-shim
 Lee Cheol-min as Kim Jin-ho
 Hong Seo-jun as Director Park
 Moon Seul-a as Nurse Choi
 Kim Moo-young as Kim Sung-tan 
 Lee Si-eon as Bong Myung-tae

Ratings 
 In this table,  represent the lowest ratings and  represent the highest ratings.

Awards and nominations

Notes

Citations

External links
  

2017 South Korean television series debuts
2018 South Korean television series endings
Korean-language television shows
MBC TV television dramas
Television series by Kim Jong-hak Production